Antheminia is a genus of true bugs belonging to the family Pentatomidae.

The genus was first described by Mulsant and Rey in 1866.

The species of this genus are found in Europe, Northern America, Japan.

Species
These species belong to the genus Antheminia:
 Antheminia aliena (Reuter, 1891)
 Antheminia eurynota
 Antheminia lunulata (Goeze, 1778)
 Antheminia pusio (Kolenati, 1846)
 Antheminia remota
 Antheminia sulcata
 Antheminia varicornis (Jakovlev, 1874)

References

Pentatomidae